Welnos is a reconstructed Indo-European deity associated with cattle with possible descendants in various mythologies, including Slavic, Lithuanian, Latvian, Norse, and Old English. The deity was reconstructed from the Slavic god Veles, Lithuanian god Velnias, and Latvian god Velns, all of whom are considered protectors of flocks. The name of the deity is also similar to Old Norse Ullr and Old English Wuldor.

According to scholar Jaan Puhvel, Welnos is also connected to the Elysian fields in Greek myth and ritual. However, there is little evidence to support the existence of a god of cattle in northern lands.

In the past, some scholars, such as Max Muller, believed that Welnos, along with Veles, Velnias, and Velns, were related to Sanskrit Varuna and Greek Ouranos. However, this theory has been rejected on linguistic grounds, as the etymology is now rejected.

Welnos may have been a kind of benevolent sky father representing the night in contrast to Dyēus the aggressive day sky father. He may have had a rivalry with Perkwunos similar to the rivalry between Perun and Veles.

References

Proto-Indo-European deities
Proto-Indo-European mythology
Reconstructed words
Cattle deities